Oshtorinan Rural District is a rural district (dehestan) in Oshtorinan District, Borujerd County, Lorestan Province, Iran. At the 2006 census, its population was 5,699, in 1,503 families.  The rural district has 15 villages.

References 

Rural Districts of Lorestan Province
Borujerd County